DeLand is a city in and the county seat of Volusia County, Florida, United States. As of the 2020 U.S. census, the population was 37,351. It is a part of the Deltona–Daytona Beach–Ormond Beach metropolitan area, which was home to 590,289 people as of the 2010 census.

The city was founded in 1876, and was named for its founder, Henry Addison DeLand. DeLand is home to Stetson University, Florida's oldest private college, as well as the Museum of Art - DeLand. The DeLand Municipal Airport serves as an uncontrolled general aviation reliever airport to commercial operations at Daytona Beach International Airport (DAB), Orlando Sanford International Airport (SFB) and Orlando International Airport (MCO).

History
Known as Persimmon Hollow for the wild persimmon trees that grow around the natural springs, the area was originally accessible only by steamboat up the St. Johns River. It was settled in 1874 by Captain John Rich, who built a log cabin. Henry Addison DeLand, a baking soda magnate from Fairport, New York, visited there in 1876, and envisioned building a citrus, agricultural and tourism center. That year he bought land and founded the town, naming it after himself. He sold his northern business and hired people to clear land, lay out streets, erect buildings and recruit settlers, most of whom came from upstate New York. (DeLand never lived in the city year-round.)

In 1877 DeLand built a public school for the town. To enhance the community's stature and culture, and to enhance the value of his local real estate holdings, in 1883 DeLand established DeLand Academy, Florida's first private college. However, in 1885, a freeze destroyed the orange crop. One story has it that DeLand had guaranteed settlers' investments as an inducement to relocate, and so was obligated to buy back their ruined groves, though there is no hard evidence that this took place. As for many other would-be real estate magnates in the area at the time, his Florida investments were nearly worthless after the freeze, and he returned to his home in the North. DeLand entrusted the academy to his friend John B. Stetson, a wealthy hat manufacturer from Philadelphia and one of the institution's founding trustees. In 1889, it was renamed John B. Stetson University in its patron's honor. In 1900 it founded the first law school in Florida (which relocated to Gulfport in 1954). Its various sports teams are called the Hatters.

The City of DeLand was officially incorporated in 1882, and became the county seat of Volusia County in 1887. It was the first city in Florida to have electricity. According to city officials, minutes of the first City Commission meeting in 1882 show the city decided to create a seal with the emblems of "Faith, Hope and Charity," namely a cross, an anchor and a heart.

The city seal was briefly the object of a controversy in 2013, when the national group Americans United for Separation of Church and State sent the city a letter in which they argued that the seal unconstitutionally promotes Christianity, thus allegedly breaching the First Amendment Establishment Clause. The controversy faded after the city refused to change the seal.

During the 1920s Florida Land Boom, fine examples of stucco Mediterranean Revival architecture by native architect Medwin Peek and others were constructed in DeLand. Many of these buildings have been handsomely restored, including the restored Athens Theatre.

Since 1992, the city has hosted the DeLand Fall Festival of the Arts, a two-day event held annually in the historic downtown area on the weekend before Thanksgiving. As of 2009, the event has an annual attendance of more than 50,000 during the weekend.

Geography

Topography

DeLand is drained by the St. Johns River.

Climate 

On February 2, 2007, DeLand and the surrounding area was the site of a major tornado outbreak. One tornado passed through Deland. It reached a peak intensity of EF-3 (160–165 mph), had a track length of 26 miles, and was responsible for the deaths of 13 people. On August, 18, 2020, an EF-2 tornado made landfall in DeLand Around 4 PM EST, and caused an estimated $7.4 million in damages over its 4.6 mile path.

Demographics

As of the census of 2013, there were 28,237 people, 9,950 households, and 4,631 families residing in the city. The population density was 1317.1/mi2 (506.8/km2). The racial makeup of the city was 74.96% White, 19.18% African American, 0.22% Native American, 0.81% Asian, 0.01% Pacific Islander, 3.00% from other races, and 1.80% from two or more races. Hispanic or Latino of any race were 8.73% of the population.

There were 8,375 households, out of which 23.8% had children under the age of 18 living with them, 37.0% were married couples living together, 14.6% had a female householder with no husband present, and 44.7% were non-families. 37.2% of all households were made up of individuals, and 20.4% had someone living alone who was 65 years of age or older. The average household size was 2.22 and the average family size was 2.92.

In the city the population was spread out, with 20.7% under the age of 18, 14.9% from 18 to 24, 23.2% from 25 to 44, 17.6% from 45 to 64, and 23.6% who were 65 years of age or older. The median age was 38 years. For every 100 females, there were 83.0 males. For every 100 females age 18 and over, there were 77.8 males.

The median income for a household in the city was $28,712, and the median income for a family was $35,329. Males had a median income of $26,389 versus $20,114 for females. The per capita income for the city was $15,936. About 14.2% of families and 19.0% of the population were below the poverty line, including 31.3% of those under age 18 and 8.7% of those age 65 or over.

Historic districts

Downtown DeLand's main street, Woodland Boulevard, has a number of notable 19th-century buildings. It is officially known as Downtown DeLand Historic District.

The Garden District is a mixed-use neighborhood adjacent to downtown DeLand, which is officially known as Downtown DeLand's Historic Garden District. The neighborhood was originally developed between 1900 and 1920. It fell into a long period of decline after World War II, and by the 1980s, had become blighted.

In 2001, Michael E. Arth, a California artist, urban designer and filmmaker, bought 27 dilapidated structures, renamed the area the Garden District, and lobbied to create a new historic district. During the following eight years, he restored or rebuilt 32 homes and businesses, which have become the core of a neighborhood revival. The feature-length documentary film New Urban Cowboy: Toward a New Pedestrianism tells the story of DeLand and the Garden District. The film premiered in DeLand in January 2009 at the newly restored Athens Theatre. Previously, the film had appeared in seven film festivals and received the Audience Choice Award at the Real to Reel International Film Festival in 2008.

Economy

Shopping
Victoria Park Village Shopping Center
Brandywine Shopping Center
DeLand Flea Market
DeLand Plaza Shopping Center
Northgate Shopping Center
Woodland Plaza
West Volusia Regional Shopping Center

Businesses
Mystic Powerboats

Education
Public primary and secondary education is handled by Volusia County Schools.

Elementary schools
Saint Peters Catholic School
Blue Lake Elementary
Freedom Elementary
George W. Marks Elementary
Edith I. Starke Elementary
Woodward Avenue Elementary
Citrus Grove Elementary
 Saint Barnabas Episcopal School
Children's House Montessori School
Casa Montessori School

Middle schools
DeLand Middle School
Southwestern Middle School
Saint Barnabas Episcopal School
Saint Peters Catholic School

High schools
 DeLand High School

Colleges and universities
 Stetson University
 Daytona State College
 Florida Technical College

Sister Cities
 Belén (canton)

Sports and recreation
DeLand hosts all home games for Stetson University Hatters athletic teams. The men's and women's basketball teams play at the J. Ollie Edmunds Center, an on-campus arena which opened in 1974 and seats approximately 5,000 spectators.

The Hatters baseball team plays at Melching Field at Conrad Park, a 2,500-seat ballpark located off campus just south of downtown DeLand. Melching Field was built in 1999 and is recognized as one of the finer college baseball venues in the NCAA, having hosted numerous Atlantic Sun Conference championships, the 2018 NCAA Baseball Regionals, and other baseball related tournaments and events. Prior to the opening of Melching Field, the Hatters played at old Conrad Park on the same site, which also hosted spring training games in the 1940s and 1950s and the DeLand Red Hats, a Florida State League minor league franchise.

Adjacent to Melching Field is Spec Martin Stadium, a 6,000-seat football stadium. Spec Martin Stadium hosts DeLand High School Bulldog football and soccer games, and serves as home of the Stetson University Hatters football team. Stetson had discontinued its football program in the early 1960s, but reinstated the sport in 2013, when it joined the Pioneer Football League.  As part of Stetson's re-entry into college football, Spec Martin Stadium underwent significant renovations, including a new press box, handicapped and premium seating areas, and new locker room facilities.

DeLand has been called the "skydiving capital of the world", with the majority of skydiving industries calling it home. The skydiving industry employs over 500 workers from the DeLand area. This in combination with the tourist end of the industry makes it one of the town's largest supporters and invaluable to the local economy.

The Central Florida Warriors of the USA Rugby League are based in DeLand.

In the movies
DeLand has been the filming location for a number of television and movie projects, including the 1999 Adam Sandler comedy The Waterboy. Scenes showing the fictional South Central Louisiana State University Mud Dogs home football games were shot at Spec Martin Stadium. Classroom and exterior scenes were filmed at Stetson University. Scenes involving Sandler's character's home were actually filmed in neighboring DeBary. Ghost Story, starring Fred Astaire, Douglas Fairbanks, Jr and Craig Wasson, was filmed in part at Stetson University and the Holiday House.

The HBO miniseries From the Earth to the Moon filmed several scenes on the campus of Stetson University. The 1999 independent film The First of May, starring Mickey Rooney and Joe DiMaggio, was shot on various locations throughout DeLand. Days of Thunder, starring Tom Cruise, was partially filmed in DeLand.

New Urban Cowboy: Toward a New Pedestrianism (2008) was filmed almost entirely in DeLand in 2006 and 2007.

Walt Before Mickey filmed several scenes at the Stetson University campus in 2014 and Athens Theatre.

Media

Newspapers
 The West Volusia Beacon, a weekly news publication covering DeLand and West Volusia County
 The Daytona Beach News-Journal, a daily newspaper covering the Greater Daytona Beach Area and Volusia County
 The Orlando Sentinel, a newspaper based in Orlando with a bureau covering Volusia County

Radio stations

AM
 WYND, 1310, religious
 WTJV, 1490, Spanish language

FM
 W247AK, 97.3, translator for WJLU
 WOCL, 105.9, classic hits

Publishing
Everett/Edwards

Notable people

 Horace Allen, baseball player
 Byllye Avery, health care activist
 Charles P. Bailey (pilot), former U.S. Army Air Force officer, Tuskegee Airman
 R. H. Barlow, author, poet, anthropologist, and historian
 Bill Booth, skydiving engineer, inventor, and entrepreneur
 David Cohen, CEO and founder of TechStars
 Joyce Cusack, Florida politician and retired registered nurse
 Terence Trent D'Arby, singer-songwriter
 Jacob deGrom, baseball player
 Paul Dicken, baseball player
 Bert Fish, envoy to Egypt, Saudi Arabia, and Portugal
 R. Buckminster Fuller, world-renowned 20th-century inventor, mathematician and futurist, inventor of the geodesic dome, coined the phrase "Spaceship Earth"
 Mike Gillislee, football player
 Lue Gim Gong, horticulturalist
 Bridgette Gordon, basketball player
 Stephen Guarino, actor and comedian
 Ed Hickox, umpire
 Burling Hull, magician
 Carolyn J. B. Howard, politician
 Craig T. James, congressman
 Arthur Jones, inventor
 Chipper Jones, Hall of Fame baseball player
 Danny Kelley, racing driver
 Kitty, musician and rapper
 J. C. Van Landingham, NASCAR driver
 Gary Russell Libby, art historian, curator, and director emeritus of Museum of Arts and Sciences
 Vincent Martella, actor
 Jack Ness, baseball player
 Lena Paul (1993– ), pornographic actress
 Medwin Peek, Mediterranean Revival architect
 Luke Scott, baseball player
 Frances Shimer, founder of Shimer College in Illinois
 Maurice Starr, musical entrepreneur New Edition, New Kids on the Block
 John Batterson Stetson, hat manufacturer
 Tra Thomas, football player
 William Amory Underhill, public servant
 Noble "Thin Man" Watts, musician
 Luke Weaver, baseball player
 Verner Moore White, artist
 Earl Ziebarth, state representative

Sites of interest
 African American Museum of Art
 Alexander Haynes House
 Athens Theatre
 Chief Master at Arms House
 DeLand Hall
 DeLand Municipal Airport
 Downtown DeLand Historic District
 John B. Stetson House
 Kilkoff House
 Museum of Art - DeLand
 Old DeLand Memorial Hospital
 Stetson University Campus Historic District
 Stockton-Lindquist House
 Volusia County Fair and Expo Center
 Volusia Speedway Park
 West Volusia Historical Society & Museum

Transportation

Rail and public transportation

Amtrak, the national passenger rail system, serves DeLand, operating its Silver Meteor and Silver Star trains daily in both directions between Miami and New York City. The line is primarily CSX's Sanford Subdivision. It also contains a spur leading from the station which was built by the Orange Ridge, DeLand and Atlantic Railroad and has received passenger service in the past.

Local transit service is provided by VOTRAN on the #20 and #60 routes.

Aviation
During World War II, the Babcock Airplane Corporation manufactured 60 Waco CG-4 assault gliders at DeLand, but the firm was out of business by 1945.

The DeLand Municipal Airport (a.k.a.; Sidney H. Taylor Field) still operates as a general aviation airport as well as a reliever airport for Orlando and Daytona Beach. It also contains the DeLand Naval Air Station Museum.

Roads
The major US highways through DeLand are US 17 (hidden SR 15) and 92 (hidden SR 600), which overlap each other from Lake Alfred in Polk County to the northern part of the city. From here, US 92 turns east onto International Speedway Boulevard toward Daytona Beach, while US 17 continues north towards Barberville, Jacksonville, and along the coast of Georgia, the Carolinas and southern Virginia.
The main west-to-east state highway in DeLand is Florida State Road 44 which runs along New York Avenue. SR 44 intersects US 17/92 in Downtown DeLand but making turns at the intersection is prohibited. Access between the two road requires taking side roads within the vicinity.
Florida State Road 15A is an alternate route of SR 15, one of the two hidden state roads along US 17 and 92. It runs along the west side of the city, and also serves as an undesignated truck bypass for US 17/92, as well as SR 44. North of International Speedway Boulevard (Volusia CR 92) and the city line, it is strictly a truck detour for US 17.

See also
Yemassee Settlement

References

External links

 
 City of DeLand official website
 The Florida Agriculturist, historical newspaper for DeLand, Florida fully and openly available in the Florida Digital Newspaper Library

 
Cities in Florida
Cities in Volusia County, Florida
Populated places established in 1876
County seats in Florida
Academic enclaves
1876 establishments in Florida